Rogelio Martínez may refer to:
 Rogelio Martínez (baseball) (1918–2010), Cuban baseball pitcher in Major League Baseball
 Rogelio Martínez (boxer) (born 1974), Dominican Republic boxer
 Rogelio Martínez Díaz, Afro-Cuban musician with Sonora Matancera
 Rogelio Nores Martínez (1906–1975), Argentine engineer and politician